This is a list of telephone companies in Italy

 Acantho
 Aexis
 Alcotek
 Alltre
 Amtel
 ASCO
 Atlanet
 Bergamocom (only in Bergamo)
 Blu
 Brennercom (coverage only in South Tyrol, Trentino and Northern Italy)
 BT Italia
 Budget Telecom
 Cdc 1085
 ClickTel
 Colt Telecom
 Digitel
 EasyTel
 EcsNet
 Elemedia
 Elitel
 Energit
 Eurotime Communication
 Eutelia
 FASTWEB
 FreeLine
 ho.
 Iliad
 Infostrada
 Intred
 Kena Mobile
 Leadercom
 Linkem
 LTS (coverage in Sicily)
 Messagenet
 Millecom
 Mobaila
 Momax
 Nodalis
 Noicom
 OlimonTel
 Orobiacom
 Plugit
 Selet Telecomunicazioni
 Tag Comunicazioni
 TIM
 Tibis Communication
 Tiscali
 Very Mobile
 Vodafone
 Wind
 Wind Tre (formerly 3 Italy)

See also

 List of companies of Italy
 List of public utilities

References

Italy Telephone companies, Italian

Telephone
Italian telephone